Tolon is a small town and is the capital of Tolon District, a district in the Northern Region of north Ghana.

References 

Populated places in the Northern Region (Ghana)